Charles-Louis-Félix Franchot (born 16 September 1809 in Saint- Venant - 31 July 1881 in Ancerville (Meuse) ) was a French designer, inventor, mechanical engineer.
He worked as a tax officer as well as developing his inventions.

He is the son of an officer who fought in the revolutionary and then Napoleonic armies and ended his career with the rank of lieutenant colonel, was made officer of the legion of honor (1807) and received the title of baron of the Empire. His mother was Marie Dieudonne Wallart de Maranville.

But from 1840 on, it is like "mechanic" and especially as "engineer" that he is presented in the press; he is indeed the inventor of a hot air machine (presented at the Academy of Sciences which abstains, however, to report on the invention) and especially a moderator lamp which ensures him a national fame.

The Franchot's hot air machine, is according to scientists, the hot air engine that meets best the Carnot cycle. Around 10 years later than Stirling engine, Franchot re-invented the regenerator (he called it the Calefactor) without knowing the existence of Stirling's invention.

In 1836 he filed a patent for his Moderator lamp.  The lamp had the advantage of simplicity in its mechanism when compared to  other pump operated lamps designed in the 1820s. It became a cheap and popular oil lamp. The lamp was produced by the lamp manufacturers JAC (Rue du Faubourg-St Martin 39) and Hadrot (Rue des Fossés-Montmartre).

A patent dispute later arose with the brothers Levavasseur who claimed to have created the lamp design. The patent judges ruled in 1845 that Franchot had invented nothing new in his  lamp.

In 1854 he invented a hot air engine similar to the earlier  Stirling engine but with two double acting cylinders which minimised thermal loses.

He was awarded the honour of Knight of the Legion of Honour in 1855.

He died unmarried at Ancerville in 1881, aged 71. Six years later, at the request of his will,  his remains were re-interred on his former estate at Franchot ponds. His grave is marked by an oak tree planted at that time and is surrounded by wrought iron railings.  There is an enamelled plate with his portrait and an inscription.

References 

1809 births
1881 deaths
19th-century French inventors
Lighting engineers